Giacomo Luigi Buonocore ('Guac') Lamplough (born 11 November 1969) is an international cricketer from Hong Kong who made his debut for the Hong Kong national team in 2015. Lamplough made a name for himself using a split bat in 2015.

Lamplough was born in Hong Kong to George Lamplough, a New Zealand-born lawyer, and his Italian wife. He was educated at South Island School, and plays domestically for the Hong Kong Cricket Club. Lamplough made his debut for Hong Kong in July 2015, playing a single match (against the United States) at the 2015 World Twenty20 Qualifier. Aged 17 at the time of his debut, he had only been called into the squad after another player, Waqas Barkat, had to withdraw from the team due to visa issues. His sister, Marina Lamplough does the same with a debut in 2014.

References

External links
Player profile and statistics at CricketArchive
Player profile and statistics at ESPNcricinfo

1997 births
Living people
Hong Kong cricketers
Hong Kong people of Italian descent
Hong Kong people of New Zealand descent